The Smith & Wesson Model 36 (also known as the Chief's Special) is a revolver chambered for .38 Special. It is one of several models of J-frame revolvers. It was introduced in 1950, and is still in production in the classic blued Model 36 and the stainless steel Model 60.

History

The Model 36 was designed in the era just after World War II, when Smith & Wesson stopped producing war materials and resumed normal production. For the Model 36, they sought to design a revolver that could fire the more powerful (compared to the .38 Long Colt or the .38 S&W) .38 Special round in a small, concealable package. Since the older I-frame was not able to handle this load, a new frame was designed, which became the J-frame.

The new design was introduced at the International Association of Chiefs of Police (IACP) convention in 1950, and was favorably received. A vote was held to name the new revolver, and the name "Chiefs Special" won. A  barreled version design went into production immediately, due to high demand. It was available in either a blued or nickel-plated finish. It was produced as the "Chiefs Special" until 1957, when it then became the Model 36. The "Chiefs Special" continued to be manufactured as a separate variant.

In 1951, Smith & Wesson introduced the Airweight Model 37, which was basically the Model 36 design with an aluminum frame and cylinder. The aluminum cylinders proved to be problematic and were abandoned in favor of a steel cylinder.

In 1989, Smith & Wesson introduced the LadySmith variant of the Model 36. This model also featured special grips designed specifically for women, and had "LADYSMITH" engraved on the frame.

Approximately 615 Model 36-6 Target variations were produced. This variant had a 3-inch full lug barrel with adjustable sights and a blued glass finish.

In 2002, Smith & Wesson reintroduced the Model 36 with gold features (hammer, thumbpiece, extractor, and trigger), calling it the "Model 36 Gold". The gold color was actually titanium nitride.

In 2005, Smith & Wesson produced the "Texas Hold 'Em" variant. This was produced with a blued finish, imitation ivory grips, and 24k gold plate engraving.

Many Model 37 variants with a lanyard ring attached were made for Japan. Part of this contract was cancelled, resulting in many of these being sold to a wholesaler, who then re-sold them for civilian use. These entered the civilian market in 2001. In 2006, the Model 37 was dropped from Smith & Wesson's catalog.

Serial number 337 was shipped to J. Edgar Hoover and is engraved with his name.

In 1958, Spanish manufacturer Astra developed a high quality revolver line based on this weapon, under the name of Astra Cadix, Astra 250 and Astra NC6.

Design and features

Designed to be small and compact, the Model 36 has been produced with 2-inch (1.875 inch actual length) or 3-inch barrels with fixed sights. A version with an adjustable rear sight, the Model 50 Chief's Special Target, was also produced in limited numbers with both 2-inch and 3-inch barrels.

Like nearly all other "J-frame" Smith & Wesson revolvers, it has a 5-round capacity in a swing-out cylinder, and features an exposed hammer. It features a nickel-plated or blued finish and either wood or rubber grips.

Users 

 : Shipped 5,344 Model 37s in 2003 and additional 5,519 in 2005 for the National Police Agency.
 : For many years, this revolver was the standard police detective and "plainclothes man" carry weapon for many police agencies including the NYPD.  Many police officers still use it or one of its newer Smith & Wesson descendants as a "back up" weapon to their primary duty pistol or as their "off-duty" weapon.

References

External links

 World Guns page

.38 Special firearms
Police weapons
Revolvers of the United States
Smith & Wesson revolvers